The Southeast Gainesville Residential District is a U.S. historic district (designated as such on January 14, 1988) located in Gainesville, Florida. It contains 94 historic buildings.

References

External links
 Florida's Office of Cultural and Historical Programs - Alachua County
 Historic Markers in Alachua County

Geography of Gainesville, Florida
National Register of Historic Places in Gainesville, Florida
Historic districts on the National Register of Historic Places in Florida